Édouard Chabert (29 November 1902 – 25 November 1995) was a French sailor. He competed in the Star event at the 1952 Summer Olympics.

References

External links
 

1902 births
1995 deaths
French male sailors (sport)
Olympic sailors of France
Sailors at the 1952 Summer Olympics – Star
Sportspeople from Marseille